The 1982 World Figure Skating Championships were held in Copenhagen, Denmark from March 9 to 14. At the event, sanctioned by the International Skating Union, medals were awarded in men's singles, ladies' singles, pair skating, and ice dancing.

The ISU Representative was Olaf Poulsen and the ISU Technical Delegate was Josef Dědič. It was the first worlds with different judging panels for compulsory figures, short programs, and compulsory dance on one side and for the free skatings and free dance on the other.

Medal tables

Medalists

Medals by country

Results

Men

Referee:
 Sonia Bianchetti 

Assistant Referee:
 Martin Flesenreich 

Judges for the compulsory figures and the short program:
 Markus Germann 
 Maria Zuchowicz 
 Elaine DeMore 
 Walburga Grimm 
 Monique Georgelin 
 Giordano Abbondati 
 Ludwig Gassner 

Substitute judge:
 Dennis McFarlane 

Judges for the free skating:
 Oskar Urban 
 Tjaša Andrée 
 Sally-Anne Stapleford 
 Britta Lindgren 
 Kinuko Ueno 
 Norris Bowden 
 Leena Vainio 

Substitute judge:
 Günter Teichmann

Ladies

Referee:
 Elemér Terták 

Assistant Referee:
 Berit Årnes 

Judges for the compulsory figures and the short program:
 Leena Vainio 
 Margaret Berezowski 
 Elsbeth Bon 
 Toshio Suzuki 
 Jacqueline Kendall-Baker 
 Eugen Romminger 
 Tatiana Danilenko 

Substitute judge:
 Sally-Anne Stapleford 

Judges for the free skating:
 Markus Germann 
 Maria Zuchowicz 
 Elaine DeMore 
 Walburga Grimm 
 Monique Georgelin 
 Giordano Abbondati 
 Ludwig Gassner 

Substitute judge:
 Dennis McFarlane

Pairs

Referee:
 Benjamin T. Wright 

Assistant Referee:
 Jürg Wilhelm 

Judges for the short program:
 Virginia LeFevre 
 Sergei Kononykhin 
 Norris Bowden 
 Markus Germann 
 Pamela Davis 
 Kinuko Ueno 
 Giordano Abbondati 

Substitute judge:
 Britta Lindgren 

Judges for the free skating:
 Elfriede Beyer 
 Günter Teichmann 
 Thérèse Maisel 
 Tjaša Andrée 
 Jacqueline Kendall-Baker 
 Elsbeth Bon 
 Gerhardt Bubnik 

Substitute judge:
 Britta Lindgren

Ice dancing

Referee:
 Lawrence Demmy 

Assistant Referee:
 Hans Kutschera 

Judges for the compulsory dance:
 Joyce Hisey 
 István Sugár 
 Gerhardt Bubnik 
 Lysiane Lauret 
 Brenda Long 
 Ludwig Gassner 
 Lily Klapp 

Substitute judge:
 Tsukasa Kimura 

Judges for the free dance:
 Gerhard Frey 
 Igor Kabanov 
 Lily Klapp 
 Mary Louise Wright 
 Cia Bordogna 
 Tsukasa Kimura 
 Maria Zuchowicz 

Substitute judge:
 Ludwig Gassner

Sources
 Result list provided by the ISU

World Figure Skating Championships
World Figure Skating Championships
World Figure Skating Championships
International figure skating competitions hosted by Denmark
World Figure Skating Championships
International sports competitions hosted by Denmark
1980s in Copenhagen